Camp Hulen was a military training camp near Palacios, Texas, United States that operated from 1925 until 1946, and at one time supported the largest concentration of troops for field training in the United States military.

Camp Palacios was established in 1925 as a summer training camp for the 36th Infantry of the Texas National Guard. The camp was renamed for Major John A. Hulen (1871–1957) in 1930. In 1940, the War Department leased Camp Hulen for anti-aircraft training of National Guard units from around the country.

At its peak, the camp had facilities for 12,000 military personnel and continued as a training facility until early 1944. German prisoners of war were housed at Camp Hulen from 1943 to 1945. In 1946, the War Department returned Camp Hulen to the National Guard, for whom it had become too small. The camp was closed in 1946 and dismantled.

The army air base became the Palacios Municipal Airport in 1965. A housing development company bought the land in 2005.

See also
List of World War II prisoner-of-war camps in the United States

References

External links
"Camp Hulen 1925 - 1946" Palacios Area Historical Association
"Camp Hulen" Handbook of Texas Online

Buildings and structures in Matagorda County, Texas
Military facilities in Texas
World War II prisoner of war camps in the United States
1925 establishments in Texas
1946 disestablishments in Texas